The Philippine nightjar (Caprimulgus manillensis) is a species of nightjar in the family Caprimulgidae. It is endemic to the Philippines. Its local names are kandarapa (Tagalog) and tagolilong (Cebuano).

Its natural habitats are subtropical or tropical moist lowland forest, subtropical or tropical mangrove forest, and subtropical or tropical moist montane forest.

References

Philippine nightjar
Endemic birds of the Philippines
Philippine nightjar
Philippine nightjar
Taxonomy articles created by Polbot